A mountain lion, or cougar, is a large cat native to the Americas.

Mountain lion may also refer to:

Sports
 Sacramento Mountain Lions, a team in the United Football League
 Sullivan Mountain Lions, a minor league baseball team
 Concord Mountain Lions, the teams of Concord University, in West Virginia
 UCCS Mountain Lions, the teams of the University of Colorado Colorado Springs
 Young Harris Mountain Lions, the teams of Young Harris College, in Georgia

Other uses
 The Mountain Lion, a 1947 novel by Jean Stafford
 OS X Mountain Lion, a computer operating system
 Barbary lion, an extinct lion population that once lived in the Atlas Mountains

See also
 Mountain cat (disambiguation)